Oakland County is a county in the U.S. state of Michigan. It is part of the metropolitan Detroit area, located northwest of the city. As of the 2020 Census, its population was 1,274,395, making it the second-most populous county in Michigan, behind neighboring Wayne County. It is the largest county in the United States without a city of 100,000 residents. The county seat is Pontiac. The county was founded in 1819 and organized in 1820.

Oakland County is composed of 62 cities, townships, and villages, and is part of the Detroit–Warren–Dearborn, MI Metropolitan Statistical Area. The city of Detroit is in neighboring Wayne County, south of 8 Mile Road. In 2010, Oakland County was among the ten wealthiest counties in the United States to have over one million residents. It is also home to Oakland University, a large public institution that straddles the border between the cities of Auburn Hills and Rochester Hills.

In 1999, Oakland County started the organization Automation Alley, a nonprofit business association for technology and manufacturing businesses in Southeast Michigan. The organization has since expanded into a state-wide, Industry 4.0 knowledge center and home to the World Economic Forum's US Centre for Advanced Manufacturing.

Major employers include General Motors, Ford, and Chrysler, collectively known as the Big Three.

History

Founded by Territorial Governor Lewis Cass in 1819, sparsely settled Oakland was originally twice its current size. As was customary at the time, as populations increased, other counties were organized from its land area. Woodward Avenue and the Detroit and Pontiac Railroad helped draw settlers in the 1840s. By 1840, Oakland had more than fifty lumber mills, processing wood harvested from the region and the Upper Peninsula. Pontiac, located on the Clinton River, was Oakland's first town and became the county seat. After the Civil War, Oakland was still primarily a rural, agricultural county with numerous isolated villages. By the end of the 19th century, three rail lines served Pontiac, and the city attracted carriage and wagon factories. In the late 1890s streetcars were constructed here and to Detroit.

At that time, developers made southern Oakland County a suburb of Detroit; a Cincinnati firm platted a section of Royal Oak called "Urbanrest." Migration worked both ways. Several thousand people moved from Oakland County farms to Detroit as the city attracted factories. By 1910, a number of rich Detroiters had summer homes and some year-round residences in what became Bloomfield Hills. The auto age enveloped Pontiac in the early 1900s. The Oakland Motor Car Company was founded in 1907 and became a part of General Motors Corp., which was soon Pontiac's dominant firm.

In the 1950s, Oakland County's population boomed as the Detroiters began migrating to the suburbs. Oakland County was for a time the fourth-wealthiest county in the United States, though its position has declined somewhat since the Great Recession. The median price of a home in Oakland County increased to $164,697, more than $30,000 above the national median. Oakland County is home to several super-regional shopping malls such as Somerset Collection, Twelve Oaks Mall, and Great Lakes Crossing Outlets.

Geography

Oakland County was originally divided into 25 separate townships, which are listed below. The roots of this design were born out of the Land Ordinance of 1785 and the subsequent Northwest Ordinance of 1787. Oakland County itself is a prime example of the land policy that was established, as all townships are equal in size (save for slight variations due to waterways). Section 16 in each township was reserved for financing and maintaining public education, and even today many schools in Oakland County townships are located within that section.

Wayne County, where the city of Detroit is located, borders Oakland County to the south. 8 Mile Road, also known as "Baseline Road" in some areas, is the boundary between these counties.  The baseline was used during the original surveying for Michigan, and it serves as the northern/southern boundaries for counties from Lake St. Clair to Lake Michigan. As more working and middle-class populations moved to the suburbs from the 1950s on, this divide (8 Mile Road) became historically known as an unofficial racial dividing line between what became the predominantly black city and almost exclusively white suburbs.

Since the late 20th century, however, the patterns of de facto segregation have faded as the suburbs have become more diverse. Middle-class African Americans have left Detroit, settling in inner-ring suburbs, notably Southfield (where the population is 75% Black), west of Woodward Avenue. Based on the 2010 Census, the following cities also have significant non-white populations: Farmington (25.3%), Farmington Hills (31.7%), Novi (30.12%), Oak Park (62.61%), Lathrup Village (72.97%), Orchard Lake Village (16.08%), Rochester Hills (20.94%), Troy (29.4%), Wixom (26.28%), West Bloomfield (24.0%), Bloomfield (18.28%), Bloomfield Hills (14.2%), Ferndale (17.2%), and Madison Heights (17.7%). Ferndale has a concentration of Arab Americans, who also live in nearby areas, and numerous Asian Americans, particularly Indians, have also settled in these areas.

Adjacent counties
 Lapeer County (northeast)
 Genesee County (northwest)
 Macomb County (east)
 Wayne County (southeast)
 Washtenaw County (southwest)
 Livingston County (west)

Demographics

As of the 2010 Census, there were 1,202,362 people and 315,175 families residing in the county. 77.3% were White, 13.6% Black or African American, 5.6% Asian, 0.3% Native American, 1.0% of some other race and 2.2% of two or more races. 3.5% were Hispanic or Latino (of any race).

Regarding ancestry, in 2000 14.4% of the population were ethnically German, 9.0% Irish, 8.5% English, 8.5% Polish, 5.7% Italian and 5.5% American, 87.4% spoke only English at home; 2.0% spoke Spanish, 1.3% Syriac (Neo Aramaic) and 1.0% Arabic. The population density as of the 2000 census was 1,369 people per square mile (528/km2).

The 2000 census showed two Native American tribes with more than 1,000 members in Oakland County.  There were 2,095 Cherokee and 1,458 Chippewa.

The Jewish community of metropolitan Detroit, with a population of 72,000, is the 21st largest Jewish community in the nation.  This community is concentrated in Oakland County, especially in Southfield, Oak Park,  West Bloomfield, Bloomfield Hills, Farmington Hills, Troy and Huntington Woods.

There were 471,115 households, of which 32.40% had children under the age of 18 living with them.  54.20% were married couples living together, 9.50% had a female householder with no husband present, and 33.10% were non-families. 27.30% of all households were made up of individuals, and 8.50% had someone living alone who was 65 years of age or older. The average household size was 2.51 and the average family size was 3.09.

Among Asian Americans, eight ethnic groups had more than 1,000 members in the county in 2000. The most numerous were those of Asian Indian descent, with 20,705. Next were those of Chinese heritage, numbering 10,018. Next were those of Japanese (5,589), Filipino (5,450) Korean (5,351), Vietnamese (1,687), Pakistani (1,458) and Hmong (1,210) ancestry.

In 2001, Oakland County had the 36th largest Asian population of any county in the country. In 2002, of the Oakland-Wayne-Macomb tricounty area, Oakland County had 49% of the tri-county area's Asian population.

In terms of age, 25.20% of the county's population was under the age of 18, 7.20% from 18 to 24, 32.40% from 25 to 44, 23.90% from 45 to 64, and 11.30% was 65 years of age or older. The median age was 37 years. For every 100 females, there were 95.90 males. For every 100 females age 18 and over, there were 92.70 males.

The median income for a household in the county was $86,567, making Oakland County the 21st wealthiest county in the United States.  Males had a median income of $55,833 versus $35,890 for females. The per capita income for the county was $65,759. About 3.80% of families and 5.50% of the population were below the poverty line, including 6.50% of those under age 18 and 6.50% of those age 65 or over.

Government
The county government operates the major local courts, keeps files of deeds and mortgages, maintains vital records, administers public health regulations, and participates with the state in the provision of welfare and other social services. The county board of commissioners controls the budget but has limited authority to make laws or ordinances. In Michigan, most local government functions—police and fire, building and zoning, tax assessment, street maintenance, etc.—are the responsibility of individual cities and townships.

Law enforcement
The Oakland County Sheriff's Office is the largest sheriff's department in the state of Michigan. In 2017 it had 859 uniformed officers, although in 2022 it had nearly 100 unfilled vacancies. Republican Michael Bouchard has served as the Oakland County Sheriff since 1999.

Ten townships, 3 cities, and 2 villages in the county do not have municipal police forces, but rather contract with the sheriff for police services specific to the municipalities. Those municipalities are Addison Township (including the village of Leonard), Brandon Township (including the village of Ortonville), Clarkston, Commerce Township, Highland Township, Independence Township, Lyon Township, Oakland Township, Orion Township, Oxford Township, Springfield Township, Pontiac, and Rochester Hills. The Oakland County Sheriff's Office also operates the county jail, a civil division, marine division, alcohol and traffic enforcement units, and an aviation division. The marine patrol and rescue unit patrols 450 lakes across the county.

Elected officials
 County Executive: Dave Coulter (D-Ferndale)
 Prosecuting Attorney: Karen McDonald (D-Birmingham)
 Sheriff: Mike Bouchard (R-Bloomfield Hills)
 County Clerk/Register of Deeds: Lisa Brown (D-West Bloomfield)
 County Treasurer: Robert Wittenberg (D-Huntington Woods)
 Water Resources Commissioner: Jim Nash (D-Farmington Hills)
 Board of Commissioners: 19 members, elected from districts (13 Democrats, 6 Republicans)

(information as of December 7, 2020)

Road Commission
Roads that are not maintained by a local community (city/village) are maintained by the independent Road Commission for Oakland County, which is governed by three board members appointed by the Oakland County Board of Commissioners.

Oakland County Service Center
The East Campus of the Oakland County Service Center is located in Pontiac. It includes the county courthouse and jail for adults.

The West Campus of the Oakland County Service Center is located in Waterford Township. This includes the Oakland County Executive Building and Conference Center, and the Oakland County Children's Village, the county's juvenile detention center for children. The Children's Village acts as one of the support sites for the Waterford School District.

Politics
Oakland County was historically a bastion of suburban conservatism, and was hence a longstanding stronghold of the Republican Party. However, in the 1990s it became highly competitive, and since 2008 it has increasingly shifted Democratic, giving over 50% of its votes to the Democratic candidate for president in each election. Republican strength is concentrated in the many exurban townships of the county, while Democratic strength is concentrated in suburbs such as Royal Oak, Farmington Hills, West Bloomfield, and Southfield. Some suburbs, such as Novi, Troy, Birmingham, and Rochester, were historically strongly Republican but are now relatively split between the two parties, with younger adults tending to support Democrats and older residents tending to support Republicans.

In 1996, Bill Clinton became the first Democrat to carry Oakland County since Lyndon Johnson in 1964, and only the fourth to do so since 1892. Al Gore and John Kerry also carried the county, by narrow margins, against George W. Bush in 2000 and 2004, respectively. In 2008, the county swung significantly to Barack Obama, who became the first Democrat to win a majority in the county since LBJ, and only the third to do so since 1884. (See table at right.) He again carried the county in 2012, though by a smaller margin. Hillary Clinton won a narrow majority in 2016. In 2020, Joe Biden won 56 percent of the vote. He received over 400,000 votes, and became the first Democrat to carry the county by a margin of over 100,000 votes.

While the Democratic Party has found increasing success in presidential elections in Oakland County, the state Republican Party has remained strong in some recent gubernatorial and state elections. The county favored Republican Rick Snyder by a 22-percent margin in the 2010 Michigan gubernatorial election and again by a 12-point margin in the 2014 election; conversely, Democratic candidate Gretchen Whitmer carried the county by 17 points in the 2018 race. Republicans held a majority on the County Commission for most of its history, but following the 2018 elections, Democrats won a narrow 11-10 majority on the commission.

In the 117th Congress, Oakland County is represented by four Democrats, Brenda Lawrence (14th), Andy Levin (9th), Haley Stevens (11th) and Elissa Slotkin (8th). Slotkin and Stevens were first elected in 2018, flipping Republican-held seats.

Transportation

Air
 Oakland County International Airport (PTK) (Waterford Township) – Charter passenger facility.
 Oakland/Troy Airport (VLL) (Troy) - Executive Airport used for private, corporate, and charter flights

The following airports are located in neighboring counties:
 Detroit Metropolitan Wayne County Airport (DTW) (Romulus) – Major commercial airport and hub for Delta Air Lines and Spirit Airlines located in Wayne County.
 Bishop International Airport (FNT) (Flint) – Commercial airport located in Genesee County.
 Coleman A. Young International Airport (DET) (Detroit) – General aviation only. This airport is in Wayne County in the city of Detroit.

Major highways
  is the main north–south highway in the region, serving Flint, Pontiac, Troy, and Detroit, before continuing south (as the Fisher and Detroit-Toledo Freeways) to serve many of the communities along the shore of Lake Erie.
  runs northwest–southeast through Oakland County and (as the Jeffries Freeway) has its eastern terminus in downtown Detroit.
  runs north–south from I-75 in the south to the junction of I-96 and I-696 in the north, providing a bypass through the western suburbs of Detroit.
  runs east–west from the junction of I-96 and I-275, providing a route through the northern suburbs of Detroit.  Taken together, I-275 and I-696 form a semicircle around Detroit.
  ends just outside of Clarkston at I-75. To the south, US 24 serves suburban Detroit and Monroe before entering Ohio. Much of US 24 in Oakland County is named Telegraph Road, and it is a major north–south road extending from Toledo, Ohio, through Monroe, Wayne, and Oakland Counties to Pontiac. It gained notoriety in a song (Telegraph Road) by the group Dire Straits.
  has a northern terminus in Pontiac. The route continues southerly from Oakland County into the City of Detroit, ending downtown. The Detroit Zoo is located along M-1 in Oakland County.  M-1 is also home to the Woodward Dream Cruise, a classic-car cruise from Pontiac to Ferndale that is held in August. It is the largest single-day classic-car cruise in America.
  (Haggerty Connector) provides expressway access from Commerce and West Bloomfield Townships at Pontiac Trail to the I-96/I-275/I-696 interchange, then follows the Farmington bypass to Grand River Avenue west of Middlebelt Road, continuing along Grand River into downtown Detroit.
  runs largely parallel to I-75 from Southfield to downtown Detroit.  The service drives are named Northwestern Highway.
  (Ortonville Road, Main Street in Clarkston)
  has a southern terminus at I-75 northeast of Pontiac. To the north, the route continues to Lapeer and beyond. Note: M-24 and US 24 do not intersect at present, although this was the case until the 1950s.
  runs north–south from I-94 in Allen Park to Southfield.  North of Nine Mile Road, the freeway ends and continues as Southfield Road into Birmingham.
  (Highland Road [from Pontiac westerly], Huron Street [within Pontiac] and Veterans Memorial Freeway [Pontiac to Utica]), continues east in Macomb County as Hall Road to Clinton Township and west to I-96 near Howell
  Perhaps better known as 8 Mile Road, M-102 follows the Oakland–Wayne county line for most of its length. 8 Mile Road, known by many due to the film 8 Mile, forms the dividing line between Detroit on the south and the suburbs of Macomb and Oakland counties on the north. It is also known as Baseline Road outside of Detroit, because it coincides with the baseline used in surveying Michigan; that baseline is also the boundary for a number of Michigan counties. It is designated M-102 for much of its length in Wayne County.
  serves as a spur highway from M-59 into the city of Rochester.
 Grand River Avenue connects the suburbs of Brighton, Novi, and Farmington to downtown Detroit. The avenue follows the route of old US 16 before I-96 replaced it in 1962. It is one of the five roads planned by Judge August Woodward to radiate out from Detroit and connect the city to other parts of the state.

Rail
Amtrak's Wolverine serves Oakland County with 3 daily trains each way, stopping in Pontiac, Troy, Royal Oak, and continuing on to Chicago. In pre-Amtrak years Birmingham, Pontiac and other stations were stops for Grand Trunk Western passenger trains from Detroit to points north and west. Until 1960, passengers could board trains in Birmingham and Pontiac for Grand Rapids and Muskegon on the Lake Michigan coast. From the above trains passengers could transfer at Durand Union Station for Bay City-bound mixed trains.

Mile roads

 Surface-street navigation in metro Detroit is commonly anchored by "mile roads," major east–west surface streets that are spaced at one-mile (1.6 km) intervals and increment as one travels north and away from the city center. Mile roads sometimes have two names, the numeric name (e.g., 15 Mile Road), used in Macomb County, and a local name (e.g., Maple Road), used in Oakland County (for the most part).

Bicycling
The conditions on most non-residential roads in Oakland County are not favorable to bicycling. Exceptions to this are primarily in the inner-ring suburbs within the southeast corner of the county. This is due to their street grid.

A primary reason for these unfavorable cycling conditions is the Road Commission for Oakland County has a policy of not accommodating bicycles on the road. As a result, some communities have designated sidepaths (locally called "safety paths") as bike routes which do not meet the American Association of State Highway and Transportation Officials (AASHTO) guidelines for bicycling facilities and have been found to be less safe than on-road bike facilities.

As a result, there are no designated Bicycle Friendly Communities within Oakland County.

Only the city of Ferndale has a built comprehensive bicycle network of bike lanes and signed shared roadways.

Education
The County of Oakland counterpart in public education (K–12) is the Oakland Schools, an Intermediate school district. The county is also home to multiple renowned private elementary and high schools, including The Roeper School and Cranbrook.

Higher education
Oakland County is home to several institutions of higher education.
 Baker College, Auburn Hills campus
 Oakland University, Rochester
 The Western Michigan University Thomas M. Cooley Law School, Auburn Hills campus
 Lawrence Technological University, Southfield
 Rochester University, Rochester
 Walsh College of Accountancy and Business, Troy and Novi campuses
 Oakland Community College, five campuses: Orchard Ridge (Farmington Hills), Auburn Hills, Southfield, Highland Lakes, and Royal Oak.
 Saint Mary's College of Madonna University, Orchard Lake
 Cranbrook College of Art, Bloomfield Hills

K-12 education
School districts:

 Almont Community Schools
 Avondale School District
 Berkley School District
 Birmingham City School District
 Bloomfield Hills School District
 Brandon School District
 Clarenceville School District
 Clarkston Community School District
 Clawson City School District
 Farmington Public School District
 Fenton Area Public Schools
 Ferndale Public Schools
 Goodrich Area Schools
 Grand Blanc Community Schools
 Hazel Park City School District
 Holly Area School District
 Huron Valley Schools
 Lake Orion Community Schools
 Lamphere Public Schools
 Madison Public Schools
 Northville Public Schools
 Novi Community School District
 Oak Park City School District
 Oxford Area Community Schools
 Pontiac City School District
 Rochester Community School District
 Romeo Community Schools
 Royal Oak City School District
 South Lyon Community Schools
 Southfield Public School District
 Troy School District
 Walled Lake Consolidated Schools
 Warren Consolidated Schools
 Waterford School District
 West Bloomfield School District

Sports

The NFL's Detroit Lions played their home games at the Pontiac Silverdome in Pontiac from 1975 through 2001, when they moved to Ford Field in Downtown Detroit. The Detroit Pistons played at the Silverdome from 1978 to 1988.  The Silverdome was also the site of Super Bowl XVI, where the San Francisco 49ers defeated the Cincinnati Bengals, the first of 5 Super Bowl titles for the 49ers. The Pontiac Silverdome also hosted various other sporting events, prior to being demolished in 2017.

From 1988 to 2017, prior to the move to Little Caesars Arena in Detroit, the Detroit Pistons played their home games at The Palace of Auburn Hills in Auburn Hills. The Palace of Auburn Hills was demolished in 2020.

Communities

Cities

 Auburn Hills
 Berkley
 Birmingham
 Bloomfield Hills
 Clarkston
 Clawson
 Farmington
 Farmington Hills
 Fenton (mostly in Genesee County)
 Ferndale
 Hazel Park
 Huntington Woods
 Keego Harbor
 Lake Angelus
 Lathrup Village
 Madison Heights
 Northville (partially in Wayne County)
 Novi
 Oak Park
 Orchard Lake Village
 Pleasant Ridge
 Pontiac (county seat)
 Rochester
 Rochester Hills
 Royal Oak
 South Lyon
 Southfield
 Sylvan Lake
 Troy
 Walled Lake
 Wixom

Villages

 Beverly Hills
 Bingham Farms
 Franklin
 Holly
 Lake Orion
 Leonard
 Milford
 Ortonville
 Oxford
 Wolverine Lake

Charter townships

 Bloomfield Charter Township
 Brandon Charter Township
 Commerce Charter Township
 Highland Charter Township
 Independence Charter Township
 Lyon Charter Township
 Milford Charter Township
 Oakland Charter Township
 Orion Charter Township
 Oxford Charter Township
 Royal Oak Charter Township
 Springfield Charter Township
 Waterford Charter Township
 West Bloomfield Charter Township
 White Lake Charter Township

Civil townships
 Addison Township
 Groveland Township
 Holly Township
 Novi Township
 Rose Township
 Southfield Township

Unincorporated communities

 Andersonville
 Austin Corners
 Brandon Gardens
 Campbells Corner
 Charing Cross
 Clintonville
 Clyde
 Commerce
 Davisburg
 Drayton Plains
 East Highland
 Elizabeth Lake
 Five Points
 Four Towns
 Gingellville
 Glengary
 Goodison
 Groveland Corners
 Hickory Ridge
 Highland
 Huron Heights
 Jossman Acres
 Kensington
 Lake Orion Heights
 Lakeville
 New Hudson
 Newark
 Oak Grove
 Oakley Park
 Oakwood
 Oxbow
 Perry Lake Heights
 Rose Center
 Rose Corners
 Rudds Mill
 Seven Harbors
 Springfield
 Thomas
 Union Lake
 Walters
 Waterford Village
 Waterstone
 West Highland
 Westacres
 White Lake

Lakes
Quarton Lake also known as The Old Mill Pond.

Rivers
There are four major rivers in Oakland County:

 Clinton River
 Huron River
 Rouge River
 Shiawassee River

The headwaters of each of these rivers lie in Oakland County.

See also

 Woodward Corridor
 National Register of Historic Places listings in Oakland County, Michigan
 List of Michigan State Historic Sites in Oakland County, Michigan
 Oakland County Child Killer
 Saginaw Trail

References

Further reading
 
 
  Volume 1. Volume 2

External links
 Oakland County Government official website
 Map of Oakland County
 The Road Commission for Oakland County
 An Account of Oakland County edited by Lillian Drake Avery. Dayton, Ohio: National Historical Association, Inc., [1925?]
 
 Automation Alley

 
Michigan counties
Metro Detroit
1820 establishments in Michigan Territory
Populated places established in 1820